Georgia Jayne Evans (born 16 October 1995) is a footballer who plays as a midfielder for Yeovil Town of the FA Women's National League South.

She joined the Bristol Academy Centre of Excellence in 2011 from Sporting Club Albion, and progressed through to Academy's first team in 2013. Evans has also represented Wales at senior, under-19, under-17 and under-16 levels.

She is a former pupil of Wigmore High School in Herefordshire.

In September 2017, Evans signed for WSL 1 side Yeovil Town ahead of the 2017–18 season. She joined Charlton Athletic in July 2019.

Appearances by season
As at 15 January 2016

References

1995 births
Living people
Bristol Academy W.F.C. players
Yeovil Town L.F.C. players
Women's Super League players
Wales women's international footballers
Welsh women's footballers
Women's association football defenders
Women's association football midfielders
Charlton Athletic W.F.C. players